Dimitrios Rallis (Greek: Δημήτριος Ράλλης; 1844–1921) was a Greek politician.

He was born in Athens in 1844. He was descended from an old Greek political family. Before Greek independence, his grandfather, Alexander Rallis, was a prominent Phanariote. His father, was Minister in Andreas Miaoulis' government and later Chief Justice of the Greek Supreme Court.

Rallis was elected to Parliament in 1872 and always represented the same Athenian constituency. He became Minister in several governments and served as Prime Minister five times. He last formed a government after the 1920 election and it was his cabinet that authorised the plebiscite that saw King Constantine's return to the throne.

Dimitrios Rallis died of cancer in Athens on 5 August 1921 at the age of 77. His son, Ioannis Rallis, was a Quisling Prime Minister during the war-time occupation by the German Army and his grandson, George Rallis, served as Prime Minister in the early 1980s.

References

1844 births
1921 deaths
19th-century prime ministers of Greece
20th-century prime ministers of Greece
Politicians from Athens
Prime Ministers of Greece
Greek people of the Greco-Turkish War (1897)
Greek people of the Greco-Turkish War (1919–1922)
Dimitrios
Justice ministers of Greece
Finance ministers of Greece